Channel 46 refers to several television stations:

Canada
The following television stations broadcast on digital channel 46 (UHF frequencies covering 663.25-667.75 MHz) in Canada:
 CJPM-DT in Saguenay, Quebec
 CKAL-DT-1 in Lethbridge, Alberta

Mexico
The following television network operates on virtual channel 46 in Mexico:
Televisión Tabasqueña in the state of Tabasco

See also
 Channel 46 TV stations in Mexico
 Channel 46 digital TV stations in the United States
 Channel 46 virtual TV stations in the United States
 Channel 46 low-power TV stations in the United States

46